Edward Francis Fagan (February 27, 1849 – December 7, 1901) was an American schoolteacher, principal, and politician from New York.

Life 
Fagan was born on February 27, 1849, in New York City, New York. He was of Irish parentage.

Fagan attended Manhattan College, graduating at the top of his class in 1869. He also received an M.A. in 1872 and a Ph.D. in 1880. He spent several years as a teacher for Manhattan College. In 1876, he moved to Maspeth, Queens. There, he was elected School Commissioner in 1882, served as the first principal of Long Island City High School for a number of years, and after the Consolidation of Greater New York he was appointed Superintendent of Schools in Queens. He held the latter position at the time of his death.

In 1885, Fagan was elected to the New York State Senate as a Democrat, representing New York's 1st State Senate district (Suffolk and Queens Counties). He served in the Senate in 1886 and 1887.

Fagan died at home from a brain abscess on December 7, 1901. He was buried in Calvary Cemetery.

References

External links 

 Edward F. Fagan at Find a Grave

1849 births
1901 deaths
American people of Irish descent
Manhattan College alumni
Manhattan College faculty
Educators from New York City
American school principals
People from Maspeth, Queens
School superintendents in New York (state)
19th-century American politicians
Democratic Party New York (state) state senators
Infectious disease deaths in New York (state)
Neurological disease deaths in New York (state)
Deaths from brain abscess
Burials at Calvary Cemetery (Queens)